Pyrmont Bay ferry wharf is located on the western side of Darling Harbour serving the inner-city Sydney suburb of Pyrmont. It is located adjacent to the Australian National Maritime Museum and close to The Star Casino.

History
The wharf closed on 22 April 2015 for a four-month rebuild. During this time, both Sydney Ferries and Sydney Harbour Eco Hopper ferries called at Casino wharf  instead.

Services
Pyrmont Bay wharf is served by Sydney Ferries Pyrmont Bay services operating to Circular Quay. Services are operated by First Fleet class ferries.

Interchanges

Bus
Transit Systems operates one route from the forecourt of the Australian National Maritime Museum:
389: to North Bondi

Light rail
One route operates from Pyrmont Bay light rail station:
L1 Dulwich Hill Line: Central to Dulwich Hill

References

External links

Pyrmont Bay Wharf at Transport for New South Wales (Archived 13 June 2019)
Pyrmont Local Area Map Transport for NSW

Ferry wharves in Sydney
Pyrmont, New South Wales